Stephen Demorest is an American soap opera writer. He is married to Nancy Curlee.

Positions held
All My Children
Associate Head Writer: April 8, 2005 - January 14, 2008

Another World
Associate Head Writer: March 1999 - June 25, 1999

The Last AW Writing Team
Leah Laiman (Head Writer), Jean Passanante (co-Head Writer), Gordon Rayfield, Courtney Simon, Eleanor Labine, Stephen Demorest, Melissa Salmons, Laura Maria Censabella, Judy Tate, Tom Wiggin, Tom King, Maura Penders, Richard Culliton, Shelly Altman, Carolyn Culliton, Richard J. Allen, Sofia Landon Geier, Lynn Martin, Gillian Spencer, Mary Sue Price, Edwin Klein

As the World Turns
Associate Head Writer (1996–1998; August 1999 - August 31, 2001)
Co-Head Writer: Late 1997 - March 1998

General Hospital
Associate Head Writer: 1998 - 1999
Script Writer: 1998

Guiding Light
Co-Head Writer: 1990 - 1994
Associate Head Writer: 1985 - 1990

One Life to Live
Script Writer: December 5, 2003 - September 14, 2004

Awards and nominations
Daytime Emmy Awards

WINS
(1986, 1990 & 1993; Best Writing; Guiding Light)
(1999; Best Writing; General Hospital)
(2001 & 2002; Best Writing; As the World Turns)

NOMINATIONS 
(1985, 1989 & 1992; Best Writing; Guiding Light)
(2000; Best Writing; As the World Turns)

Writers Guild of America Award

WINS
(1992 season; Guiding Light)

NOMINATIONS 
(1986, 1989, 1995 & 1996 seasons; Guiding Light)
(1998 season; As the World Turns) 
(1999 season; General Hospital) 
(2007 & 2008 seasons; All My Children)

Head writing tenure

External links

American soap opera writers
American male television writers
Daytime Emmy Award winners
Writers Guild of America Award winners
Living people
Year of birth missing (living people)